"Sentimental Lady" is a song written by Bob Welch. It was originally recorded for Fleetwood Mac's 1972 album Bare Trees, but was re-recorded by Welch on his debut solo album, French Kiss, in 1977. It is a romantic song, originally written for Welch's first wife. Welch recorded it again in 2003 for his album His Fleetwood Mac Years & Beyond.

History and release
The song was originally written by Welch at the former Gorham Hotel on 55th Street in New York City.

The original 1972 version of the song as heard on Fleetwood Mac's Bare Trees album clocked in at 4 minutes 34 seconds, with background vocals by Christine McVie. It had two verses, with a reprise of the first following the instrumental bridge.

A 1977 re-recording, the most well-known version of the song, was a solo hit for Welch when he recorded it for his first solo album, French Kiss, which was released in September 1977. The first single released from the album, "Sentimental Lady" reached the top 10 in both the U.S. Pop and Adult Contemporary charts.

Mick Fleetwood also played the drums for the song on Welch's 1977 album. The re-recording of it featured Christine McVie and Lindsey Buckingham as backing singers and producers (with Buckingham additionally doing the arrangement as well as serving on guitar), but unlike the original which had two verses, Welch's solo version only had one verse to cut it down to less than three minutes for the final radio cut.

Lyrical composition
The original placeholder/dummy lyrics for the chorus before the full lyrics were written was, "my legs are sticks and my feet are stones." The solo recording has a notable introduction with a multilayered guitar piece by Lindsey Buckingham.

Welch told Songfacts.com: "The lyric was probably referencing my first wife Nancy." In the song, he personifies the love of his life as a "sentimental, gentle wind [that is] blowing through my life again."

The Fleetwood Mac version includes a verse that begins "Now you are here today, But easily you might just go away." It is omitted from Welch's solo version, which otherwise has the same lyrics.

Donald Brackett, in his 2007 book, Fleetwood Mac, 40 Years of Creative Chaos  has discussed Welch's poetic romantic lyrics in "Sentimental Lady" and writing and performing style. He describes the featuring of the song on the 1972 album  Bare Trees as the best example of the group's move towards a new, softer and highly commercial style in the early 1970s. Brackett suggests that the essence of the lyrics and nature of the song are "almost too gentle", but describes Welch's voice as like "crushed velvet", in that he believes the voice is simultaneously gentle and threatening in tone, a symbolic balance between the emotions of hope and despair. He later says of Welch's song writing, "Welch had the unique ability to encapsulate in a single song the travails of personal intimacy as well as the larger social picture in which we all lived".

Reception
Cash Box described it as being "a startling approach to balladry" with "smooth harmonies abound."

Chart performance

Weekly charts

Year-end charts

Personnel

Fleetwood Mac version
Bob Welch – rhythm guitar, lead and backing vocals
Danny Kirwan – lead guitar, slide guitar
Christine McVie – piano, organs, backing vocals
John McVie – bass guitar
Mick Fleetwood – drums

Bob Welch version
Bob Welch – guitars, bass guitar, lead and backing vocals
Lindsey Buckingham – guitars, backing vocals
Christine McVie – backing vocals, keyboards
Mick Fleetwood – drums, tambourine

References

External links
Listen to the Bob Welch version on YouTube
Listen to the Fleetwood Mac version on YouTube

Fleetwood Mac songs
1972 songs
1977 singles
Songs written by Bob Welch (musician)
Reprise Records singles
Capitol Records singles